Vasil Levski National Stadium, named after Bulgarian national hero and revolutionary Vasil Levski (1837–1873), is the country's second largest stadium. The stadium has 43,230 seats and is located in the centre of Sofia, on the territory of the city's oldest and most famous park - the Borisova gradina.
The Bulgaria national football team's home matches and the Bulgarian Cup finals are held at the venue, as well as athletics competitions. It was used as the home venue for Levski Sofia's Champions League games, and is often used for important derbies between the big clubs from Sofia, instead of their own home stadiums.

History

Vasil Levski National Stadium was officially opened in 1953, extended in 1966 and renovated in 2002.

Prior to their demolition by the Communist authorities during the 1940s and 50s, two other stadiums stood on the ground where the current national stadium lies. One of those was Levski Sofia's club stadium, called Levski Field (Bulgarian: Igrishte Levski, completed 1934), and the other - the Yunak Stadium (built 1928), which lay partially to the southwest. The latter used to host national football team matches with its capacity of about 15,000 seats. Levski were never compensated for their loss. During the 1960s, they build a new stadium - the present day Georgi Asparuhov.

The Vasil Levski stadium was completed in 1953 with an announced capacity of 42 000. Originally, only the lower tier of stands was built (roughly half the height of the current stands), and, due to the uneven lie of the land, the western end of the pitch and stands were below ground level. 
The upper tier was built about a decade later, with the current floodlight towers built in the late 1960s.

The Vasil Levski stadium was used for athletics competitions immediately after its official opening on 5 July 1953. The first football match played there after its opening was a friendly between Dinamo Sofia and FC Wien and, a month later, it also began being used for league games. The first international was a world cup qualifier on 6 September against Czechoslovakia.

The stadium offers also judo, artistic gymnastics, basketball, boxing, aerobics, fencing and table tennis halls, as well as a general physical training hall, two conference halls and three restaurants.
It hosted the 1957 European basketball championship.

It was the proposed venue for the Opening and Closing Ceremonies in Sofia's bid for the 2014 Winter Olympics.

In July 2011, plans were announced to build a new 40,000 all-seater national stadium in the Sofia suburbs, but was later scrapped.

Concert venue
The stadium has hosted music shows by a number of regional and world stars.

The biggest concert in Bulgaria ever and thus at the Vasil Levski stadium was held by Yugoslav superstar Lepa Brena on 24 July 1990 in front of 100,000 people. This record remains unbroken to date. The curiosity of the concert was the way Lepa Brena arrived at the stadium - by landing from the helicopter directly to the stage with a rope.

American metal band Metallica held one of the most successful concerts in Bulgaria in the stadium as part of their 2008 European Vacation Tour, attracting 50,000 people.

American superstar Madonna had a very successful concert here as part of the second European second leg of her Sticky & Sweet Tour on August 29, 2009. She performed in front of 54,000 people  and was warmly welcomed by her numerous fans. After the show, the grass was badly damaged, which caused some discontent amongst football fans, national team players, coaches and staff.

On 14 May 2010, Australian rock band AC/DC played the Bulgarian capital Sofia, in front of nearly 60,000 fans as part of their Black Ice World Tour.

A festival, under the name Sofia Rocks, part of Sonisphere Festival took place on the Vasil Levski National Stadium. The festival was held over 2 days on the 22nd and 23 June with live performances by world-renowned bands such as Rammstein, Metallica, Manowar and Alice in Chains among others.

The Big Four, Metallica, Megadeth, Slayer, and Anthrax, performed all together during the Sonisphere Festival. The performance at the Sonisphere Festival in Sofia was beamed to more than 450 movie theatres in more than 140 markets in the U.S. and select cities in Europe, Canada and South America on June 22, 2010. The live video was later released on DVD and Blu-ray in October 2010, entitled The Big 4 Live from Sofia, Bulgaria.

On October 30, the North American rock band Bon Jovi announced that they will perform live at Levski during their Because We Can tour on May 14, 2013.

Concerts

Location

The stadium is located in the city centre. It can be reached by bus (lines 9, 72, 75, 76, 84, 94, 184, 204, 213, 304, 604), trolleybus (lines 1, 2, 5, 8), tram (lines 10, 12, 18) or via the Vasil Levski Stadium metro station.

References

Football venues in Bulgaria
Sports venues in Sofia
Bulgaria
Sports venues completed in 1953
1953 establishments in Bulgaria